Chama cha Haki na Usitawi (CHAUSTA) is a political party in Tanzania. The party was registered on 15 November 2001. Its founder and current chairman is James Mapalala, a former national chairman of the Civic United Front.

References

2001 establishments in Tanzania
Political parties established in 2001
Political parties in Tanzania